Silvio Soldini (born 1958, in Milan) is an Italian film director. Soldini has received 17 awards in his career and 32 nominations as of November 2015. His 2007 film Days and Clouds was selected for the main competition on the 30th Moscow International Film Festival.

Filmography

 Drimage (1982)
 Paesaggio con figure (1983)
 Giulia in ottobre (1985)
 Voci celate (1986)
 La fabbrica sospesa (1987)
 Antonio e Cleo, episode of  Provvisorio quasi d'amore (1988)
 L'aria serena dell'ovest (1990)
 Musiche bruciano (1991)
 Femmine, folle e polvere d'archivio (1992)
 Un'anima divisa in due (1993)
 Miracoli, storie per corti (1994)
 Frammenti di una storia tra cinema e periferia (1995)
 Made in Lombardia (1996)
 Dimenticare Biasca (1997)
 Le acrobate (1997)
 Il futuro alle spalle - voci da un'età inquieta (1998)
 Rom Tour (1999)
 Bread and Tulips (1999)
 Brucio nel vento (2002)
 Agata e la tempesta (2004)
 Days and Clouds (2007)
 Cosa voglio di più (2010)
 Garibaldi's Lovers (2012)
 Il colore nascosto delle cose (2017)

References

External links
 

1958 births
Living people
Italian film directors
David di Donatello winners
Nastro d'Argento winners
Ciak d'oro winners